Al Wasl may refer to:

 Al Wasl, a historical reference to the emirate of Dubai
 Al Wasl, Dubai, a locality within the modern emirate of Dubai
 Al Wasl Road, D 92 an intra-city route in Dubai
 Al Wasl SC, a Dubai-based multi-sports Club
 Al-Wasl F.C., a football club in the United Arab Emirates